Christa L. Brosseau is a Canadian chemist, currently a Canada Research Chair at Saint Mary's University (Halifax). Brosseau's research focus is on Electrochemical Surface-Enhanced Raman Spectroscopy.

Early career and education 
Brosseau was born in Halifax, Nova Scotia, and received a B.Sc. degree in chemistry from Dalhousie University and a MSc degree in 2003 under the supervision of Prof. Sharon Roscoe at Acadia University for studying the adsorption of proteins on metallic surfaces using electrochemical methods.

Graduate studies

In 2007, Brosseau completed a PhD at the University of Guelph under the supervision of Prof. Jacek Lipkowski on a project which involved using electrochemistry and infrared spectroscopy to probe the interaction of cholera toxin with a model biological membrane supported on an electrode surface.

Postdoctoral studies

In 2007, Brosseau received an Andrew W. Mellon Foundation postdoctoral fellowship to work at Northwestern University under the supervision of Prof. Richard P. Van Duyne, in collaboration with the Art Institute of Chicago. This project used surface-enhanced Raman spectroscopy (SERS) to analyze colorants in historical textiles and paintings.

Research 
In 2009, Brosseau joined the Chemistry department at Saint Mary's University as an Assistant Professor, and was promoted to Associate Professor in 2014. Brosseau was named the Canada Research Chair in Sustainable Chemistry and Materials in 2016.

The Brosseau research lab investigates the spectra observed when nanoparticles interact with light, to develop green molecular sensors. A green synthesis of silver nanoparticles improved their surface-enhanced Raman spectroscopy. Electrochemical surface-enhanced Raman spectroscopy (EC-SERS) was useful for analyzing non-heme protein adsorption at electrified interfaces. The loading of gold nanoparticles onto nitrocellulose membranes was enhanced using vertical flow, achieving greater and more consistent signal.

Brossard's early achievements include developing a rapid and precise analytical method for detecting uric acid in urine using EC-SERS for routine diagnosis of early eclampsia   and the rapid detection of melamine in milk using a portable and affordable EC-SERS system. The SERS of turmeric allowed its detection at very low concentrations in historic pastels from the painter Mary Cassatt.

Awards and honors 
 2017–2022 Canada Research Chair in Sustainable Chemistry and Materials
 2018 Anderson Award Lecturer at Memorial University
 2019 President’s Award for Excellence in Research, St. Mary's University
 Electrochemical Society (ECS) – Vice-Chairperson of Canadian section

See also
Quartz crystal nanobalance (QCN)

References

Year of birth missing (living people)
Living people
Canada Research Chairs
21st-century Canadian chemists
Academic staff of the Saint Mary's University (Halifax)
Dalhousie University alumni
Acadia University alumni
University of Guelph alumni
Place of birth missing (living people)
Canadian women chemists
21st-century Canadian women scientists